Anelka is a surname. Notable people with the surname include:

Barbara Anelka Tausia (born 1977), Belgian choreographer and dancer, wife of Nicolas
Claude Anelka (born 1968), French football manager, brother of Nicolas
Nicolas Anelka (born 1979), French footballer and manager